Nestegis montana, commonly called narrow-leaved maire, is a tree native to New Zealand.

Nestegis montana has a range from the top of the North Island near Kaitaia south to the top of the South Island around Nelson where it is much less common.

Nestegis montana is found from coastal to high altitude forest where it is often located beside streams, on ridgelines or steep slopes.

The tree can grow up to 15 metres in height with a dome shaped canopy. It has long, linear leaves that can measure up to 100 x 10 millimetres, distinguishing it from the other New Zealand Nestegis species.

The Latin specific epithet montana refers to mountains or coming from mountains.

References

montana
Trees of New Zealand
Plants described in 1958